Ipswich Academy (formerly Holywells High School) is a mixed secondary school in Ipswich, Suffolk for students aged 11 to 16. Since September 2010, it has been an Academy.

It has the capacity for over 1,300 students but had around 900 as of 2021. It has a large sports complex and a large multipurpose sports pitch.It has a large indoor sports facility. It also has a main area with a library with a Sixth Form block, and it is building new ball game courts on one of the surrounding fields.

History 
In September 2010, Holywells High School become an academy, originally  ran by the Learning Schools Trust, and was renamed Ipswich Academy. In September 2015, Paradigm Trust - a multi-academy trust formed in September 2013 - took over operation of the academy.

Paradigm Trust was formed with a very simple ethos: it is that every child is entitled to an outstanding education, with equal access to knowledge, skills, opportunities, aspirations, life chances and dignity.

It aims to provide this in many ways to every child at the schools in the Trust; leading with a well-planned and taught curriculum, in an environment where the safety and well-being of pupils are paramount.

Ipswich academy was rebuilt and reopened on the Gainsbrough estate on the 29th September 2013 by the education secretary at the time Michael Gove As an open plan school, but this was changed shortly after due to noise issues. Paridigm Trust took over the school in 2015 after a series of damning ofsted reports, and leading to the later collapse of the learning schools trust.

In 2019, Ipswich academy received a ‘Good’ rated report from ofsted after years of improvement, and soon after a new principal, Abbie Thorrington, a professional Triathlon competitor, took over.

References

External links
 School homepage

Academies in Suffolk
Secondary schools in Suffolk
Schools in Ipswich
Gainsborough District, Suffolk